Race and Social Problems is a quarterly peer-reviewed academic journal covering the sociology of race and ethnicity. It was established in 2009 and is published by Springer Science+Business Media. It is the official journal of the Center on Race and Social Problems at the University of Pittsburgh. The editor-in-chief is Gary F. Koeske (University of Pittsburgh School of Social Work). According to the Journal Citation Reports, the journal has a 2017 impact factor of 1.104.

References

External links

Ethnic studies journals
Publications established in 2009
Quarterly journals
Springer Science+Business Media academic journals
English-language journals